The 1994 Nobel Prize in Literature was awarded to the Japanese novelist Kenzaburō Ōe (1953–2023) "who with poetic force creates an imagined world, where life and myth condense to form a disconcerting picture of the human predicament today." He is the second Japanese Nobel laureate in Literature after Yasunari Kawabata was awarded in 1968.

Laureate

Kenzaburō Ōe's novels about the impact of World War II on Japan include Memushiri kouchi ("Nip the Buds, Shoot the Kids", 1958) and Hiroshima nōto ("Hiroshima Notes", 1965). His short stories and essays include Seiteki ningen ("The Sexual Man", 1963) and Kōzui wa waga tamashii ni oyobi ("The Flood Invades My Spirit" 1973). The essay Okinawa nōto ("Okinawa Notes", 1970) led to a lawsuit by two military officers. To his son, Hikari Ōe, a noted Japanese composer and musician, did he dedicate his famous Sora no kaibutsu Aguī ("Aghwee the Sky Monster", 1964) and Kojinteki na taiken ("A Personal Matter", 1964).

Nominations
Among those considered in the running were the Belgian poet, playwright and novelist Hugo Claus, who writes in Flemish; the German novelist and playwright Peter Handke (awarded in 2019); the Dutch novelist Cees Nooteboom; the Swedish poet Tomas Tranströmer (awarded in 2011); the Filipino writer and essayist Nick Joaquin; the Japanese novelist Shūsaku Endō, and the Irish poet Seamus Heaney (awarded the following year).

Nobel lecture
Ōe's Nobel lecture on 7 December 1994 entitled Aimai na Nihon no watashi ("Japan, the Ambiguous and Myself") began with a commentary on his life as a child and how he was fascinated by The Adventures of Huckleberry Finn and The Wonderful Adventures of Nils, which he used to take his mind off from the terror of World War II. He described surviving various hardships by using writing as an escape, "representing these sufferings of mine in the form of the novel," and how his son Hikari similarly uses music as a method of expressing "the voice of a crying and dark soul."

Ōe dedicated a large portion of his speech to his opinion of Yasunari Kawabata's acceptance speech, saying that the vagueness of Kawabata's title ("Japan, the Beautiful and Myself") and his discussions of the poems written by medieval Zen monks were the inspiration for the title of his acceptance speech. Ōe, however, stated that rather than feeling spiritual affinity with his compatriot Kawabata, he felt more affinity with the Irish poet, William Butler Yeats, whose poetry had a significant effect on his writings and his life, even being a major inspiration for his trilogy, A Flaming Green Tree and the source of its title. Ōe stated, "Yeats is the writer in whose wake I would like to follow." He mentioned that based on his experiences of Japan, he cannot utter in unison with Kawabata the phrase "Japan, the Beautiful and Myself". Ōe also discussed the revival of militaristic feelings in Japan and the necessity for rejecting these feelings, and how Ōe desired to be of use in a cure and reconciliation of mankind.

References

External links
1994 Press release nobelprize.org
Award ceremony speech nobelprize.org

1994